The Heart of the Greek (Greek: Romeiki kardia) is a 1953 Greek comedy film directed by Iason Novak and starring Mimis Fotopoulos, Giorgos Vlahopoulos and Soula Dimitriou.

Cast
 Mimis Fotopoulos 
 Giorgos Vlahopoulos
 Soula Dimitriou 
 Dimitris Dounakis 
 Mary Egipidou 
 Lola Filippidou 
 Sotiria Iatridou 
 Dimitris Koukis 
 Kostas Oikonomidis 
 Giorgos Rois

External links
 

1953 films
1953 comedy films
1950s Greek-language films
Greek comedy films
Greek black-and-white films